Broach may refer to:

 Broaching (metalworking), a machining operation that uses a metalworking tool with a series of chisel points mounted on one piece of steel
 Broach (nautical), a sudden loss of control of a vessel caused either by wind action or wave action
 BROACH warhead, an advanced multi-stage warhead developed by a consortium of British companies
 Broach spire, a spire that starts on a square base and is carried up to a tapering octagonal spire by means of triangular faces
 Barbed broach, a dental instrument

People 
 Chris Broach (born 1976), American musician in the band Braid
 Elise Broach (born 1963), American author

See also 
 Brooch, a decorative item designed to be attached to garments 
 Bharuch, also known as "Broach", a city and district in south Gujarat state in India